Solaris may refer to:

Arts and entertainment

Literature, television and film
 Solaris (novel), a 1961 science fiction novel by Stanisław Lem
 Solaris (1968 film), directed by Boris Nirenburg
 Solaris (1972 film), directed by Andrei Tarkovsky
 Solaris (2002 film), directed by Steven Soderbergh
 Solaris, a ship in the animated series The Mysterious Cities of Gold
 Solaris Knight, a character in the TV series Power Rangers: Mystic Force
 Suzie Solaris, a character in the movie Murderers' Row
 Birdman and the Galaxy Trio, an animated series known as "Solaris" in France

Music
 Solaris, an opera composed by Dai Fujikura, on a libretto by Saburo Teshigawara based on Stanislaw Lem's novel
 Solaris, an opera composed by Detlev Glanert (2010–12)
 Solaris (band), a progressive rock band from Hungary
 Solaris (Photek album), 2000
 Solaris (Elliot Minor album), 2009
 Sólaris, a 2011 album by Daníel Bjarnason and Ben Frost
 "Solaris", a song on Failure's 1996 album Fantastic Planet
 "Solaris", a song on Juno Reactor's 2000 album Shango
 "Solaris", a song on Buck-Tick's 2010 album Razzle Dazzle

Video games
 Solaris (video game) (1986), for the Atari 2600
 Solaris (DAH2), a Russian moon base in Destroy All Humans! 2
 The main antagonist and final boss in the 2006 video game Sonic the Hedgehog
 One of the bosses in Path of Exile
 A country in the Xenogears video game
 A race of debt slaves with augmented bodies in the online game Warframe
 Solaris galaxy, one of the settings of the Ratchet and Clank universe

Other uses in arts and entertainment
 Solaris (character), a supervillain in the DC Universe
 Solaris (magazine), a Canadian science-fiction magazine
 Solaris VII, a world in the fictional BattleTech universe

Organisations
 Solaris (synchrotron), a cyclic particle accelerator in Kraków, Poland
 Solaris Books, a British publisher
 Solaris Bus & Coach, a Polish vehicle producer
 Solaris Mobile, a satellite communications service provider
 Solaris Pictures, an Indian film production company

Other uses
 Solaris (grape), a grape variety
 Solaris (star), a star in the constellation Pegasus
 Solaris (yacht), a motor yacht
 Oracle Solaris, an operating system originally developed by Sun Microsystems
 Hyundai Solaris, a car
 Solaris, a brand of photographic film made by Ferrania
 Solaris, a community in Albemarle County, Virginia
 Solaris, a part of the Houdini graphics software package

See also
 Solar (disambiguation)